is a town located in Kuma District, Kumamoto Prefecture, Japan.

As of March 31, 2017, the town has an estimated population of 4,046 and a density of 84 persons per km². The total area is 48.41 km².

References

External links

Yunomae official website 

Towns in Kumamoto Prefecture